Jonathan Ian Barnett (born 28 January 1950) is a British football agent and is the chairman and founder of ICM Stellar Sports. In 2019, he was named the number-one most powerful sports agent in the world, according to Forbes. He is credited as being the man who brought Lennox Lewis into the boxing world.

Career 
While Barnett's first client was cricket player Brian Lara, he has made a name for himself since then representing some of the world's best football players. His client list includes Jack Grealish, Gareth Bale, Saul Niguez, Ruben Loftus-Cheek and Jordan Pickford. He masterminded the £86 million move of Bale to Real Madrid from Tottenham Hotspur.

Barnett's agency is now the fourth-biggest sports management agency in the world and number one in football.

Controversy 
In 2006, Barnett was banned by the Football Association (FA) for 12 months and fined £100,000 for arranging secret rendezvous between his client Ashley Cole and Chelsea F.C. representatives.

Personal life 
Barnett is Jewish and is member of St John's Wood synagogue. He is married and has three children. He is a supporter of Arsenal F.C.

References

External links 
http://www.telegraph.co.uk/sport/football/11377682/The-20-most-powerful-football-agents-in-European-football.html

British chief executives
British sports agents
Living people
1950 births